Belphoebe (or Belphebe, Belphœbe) is a character in Edmund Spenser's poem The Faerie Queene (1590), a representation of Queen Elizabeth I (conceived of, however, as a pure, high-spirited maiden, rather than a queen). Spenser intended her name to mean "beautiful Diana" (Phoebe being an epithet of the Greek moon goddess Artemis, who was known to the Romans as Diana), and it is suggested that she is a member of Poseidon's family. A virgin huntress, Belphoebe can certainly fight, as a potential rapist found out. She is the stronger, militant sister of Amoret.

Belphoebe is mentioned in Kipling's poem "The Queen's Men", which is based on Spenser's work and which constitutes a lament for two young sea-captains who perished on a mission to which she sent them:

Belphoebe is also mentioned in Sir Walter Raleigh's poem "If Cynthia be a Queen",

References

The Faerie Queene
Characters in epic poems
Fictional fairies and sprites
Fictional women soldiers and warriors
Fairy royalty
Fictional androgynes
Fictional hunters
Female characters in literature
Literary characters introduced in 1590